The Dallara F191 was a Formula One car designed by Gian Paolo Dallara and Nigel Cowperthwaite for use by the BMS Scuderia Italia team during the 1991 Formula One season. Its best finish was at the San Marino Grand Prix when JJ Lehto drove it to third place.

Development
The Dallara F191 car was designed by Gian Paolo Dallara and Nigel Cowperthwaite and was an entirely new albeit conventional car rather than simply a development of the previous year's car. Like the cars of most other teams, the F191 had a high nose configuration. The Cosworth DFR from 1990 was discarded and instead an exclusive supply of Judd V10 engines was sourced from Engine Developments Limited. The new engine, developed by John Judd, generated plenty of power; at the start of the year it was achieving 660 bhp and by the end of the season it was putting out over 700 bhp.

Race history
For 1991, Emanuele Pirro, who drove for the team the previous year, was retained while Andrea de Cesaris was replaced by JJ Lehto, who crashed the car heavily in pre-season testing. Scuderia Italia's failure to score any points the previous year, together with the number of teams attempting to qualify for races in the current season, meant that for the first half of the year, both drivers were forced to pre-qualify. When Lehto secured the team's best finish of the year by finishing third at the San Marino Grand Prix, the four points earned from the race meant that from the German Grand Prix onwards, he and Pirro had direct entry to qualifying. While pre-qualifying was no barrier for Lehto, Pirro had failed three times. When he qualified for races, Pirro enjoyed relatively good reliability in contrast to Lehto who only finished five races all year. Pirro's best race was at the Monaco, where he scored a single point for sixth place.

Complete Formula One results
(key) (results in bold indicate pole position; results in italics indicate fastest lap)

Notes

References

1991 Formula One season cars
Dallara Formula One cars